Bengi is a common Turkish given name. It means "eternal", "endless", "never-ending", or "immortal". It is an Oghuz accented version of Bengü which is also a Turkish given name. Compared to Bengü, Bengi has an additional meaning: "a mythical water which gives a person immortal life".

People

 Bengi Semerci, author and professor of psychiatry at Yeditepe University
 Bengi Gençer, illustrator of Bilim ve Teknik.
 Bengi Yildiz, a Member of Parliament of the Peace and Democracy Party (BDP) for Batman, Turkey.
 Bengi Ali of Karaman, was the ruler of Karmanids
 Bae "Bengi" Seong-ung, a South Korean professional League of Legends player, the assistant coach of SK Telecom T1.

Turkish feminine given names